The 2014 Scottish Women's Premier League Cup was the 13th edition of the SWPL Cup competition, which began in 2002. The competition was to be contested by all 12 teams of the Scottish Women's Premier League (SWPL

First round 
eight teams contested the first round Forfar Farmington forfeited the tie against Glasgow City who was given a bye into the next round.

Quarter finals

Semi finals

Final

External links
Results at Soccerway.com

References

1
Scot
Scottish Women's Premier League seasons